Heads Up! is an American television game show based on the mobile app of the same name, itself inspired by a segment on The Ellen DeGeneres Show. The series is hosted by Loni Love.

Sixty-five episodes of the show were produced for HLN, but prior to airing, the channel shelved it in March 2016. The production company behind the series, Telepictures, confirmed they were looking into other possible partners. The completed episodes would eventually air in Canada on Family Channel and Family Chrgd.

See also
 List of television series canceled before airing an episode

References

External links
 Heads Up! at Family.ca
 

2010s American game shows
Unaired television shows
2017 American television series debuts
2017 American television series endings
English-language television shows
CNN Headline News original programming
American television shows based on video games
Television series by A Very Good Production
Television series created by Ellen DeGeneres
Television series by Telepictures